Iván Pastor Lafuente (born 18 February 1980 in Alicante) is a Spanish windsurfer. He competed at the men's sailboard event in the 2004 Summer Olympics, when the Mistral class was the sailboard event, and the 2008 and 2012 Summer Olympics when the sailboard class was the RS-X. In 2005 he won a bronze medal at the Mistral European Championship.  In addition, he won a silver medal at the 2001 Mediterranean Games held in Tunisia, in the Mistral class.

Notes

References

External links
 
 
 

1980 births
Living people
Spanish windsurfers
Spanish male sailors (sport)
Olympic sailors of Spain
Sailors at the 2004 Summer Olympics – Mistral One Design
Sailors at the 2004 Summer Olympics – Tornado
Sailors at the 2008 Summer Olympics – RS:X
Sailors at the 2012 Summer Olympics – RS:X
Sailors at the 2016 Summer Olympics – RS:X
Sportspeople from Alicante